Anthony Temple Bourne-Arton (1 March 1913 – 28 May 1996) was a British Conservative Party politician.

He was elected at the 1959 general election as Member of Parliament for Darlington, following the retirement of the Conservative  MP Fergus Graham.  Bourne-Arton served for only one parliament, losing his seat at the 1964 general election to Labour's Edward Fletcher.

He was educated at Clifton College. He took on the name Arton as a condition of his marriage.

References

External links 
 

1913 births
1996 deaths
Conservative Party (UK) MPs for English constituencies
UK MPs 1959–1964
People educated at Clifton College